Sir Leslie Knox Munro  (26 February 190113 February 1974) was a New Zealand lawyer, journalist, diplomat and politician.

Law and media
Munro studied at Auckland Grammar School and the University of Auckland, where he graduated with a Master of Laws in 1923. He became dean of the law faculty at the University of Auckland in 1938, and taught and administrated at the university in a variety of roles until 1951. Munro was also president of the Auckland District Law Society from 1936 to 1938. Munro gave radio talks on world events for the New Zealand National Broadcasting Service (NBS), and wrote for The New Zealand Herald, where he was editor from 1942 to 1951.

Diplomatic career

Munro was a founding member of the New Zealand National Party, and held significant executive positions in the party, helping it to victory in the 1949 general election. In 1952 the new Prime Minister, Sidney Holland, appointed Munro the New Zealand ambassador to the United States, and the permanent representative of New Zealand to the United Nations. In that capacity, he lobbied for the New Zealand government to support efforts by the United States to increase its involvement in Indochina in response to the success of the Viet Minh during the First Indochina War. While he came to recognize the Viet Cong as an indigenous movement, he still contended that it was supported by North Vietnam and the People's Republic of China as part of a campaign of Communist subversion against South Vietnam. As New Zealand's permanent representative to the UN, he served as president of the Trusteeship Council from 1953 to 1954 and President of the United Nations General Assembly for its twelfth session (1957–1958). He was also three times President of the Security Council, and was serving in that position at the outbreak of Suez Crisis in 1956. At the UN he was an outspoken critic of the Soviet response to the 1956 Hungarian Revolution, and was appointed the special representative for the 'Hungarian question'.

Munro was knighted in 1955 with a KCMG, followed by a KCVO in 1957. Although he was removed from his position as permanent representative in 1958 by the second Labour government he remained a special representative until 1962, and was also secretary-general of the International Commission of Jurists from 1961. He wrote the widely read United Nations:Hope for a divided world in 1960.
For the academic year 1960–1961, he was a Fellow on the faculty in the Center for Advanced Study at Wesleyan University, Middletown, Connecticut.

National politics

At the end of Munro's appointment to Washington he had been replaced by a career diplomat. After the 1960 New Zealand election Munro expected the new National government to either reappoint him to Washington or to give him the post of High Commissioner to London. His personal traits had however made him unpopular amongst the senior officials of the Prime Minister's Department and External Affairs. A recommendation was made to the new Prime Minister Keith Holyoake that Munro not be reappointed to an overseas diplomatic position.
 
By this time Munro was seeking to become a National Party Member of Parliament. He had previously proposed to stand for Tamaki in  but only if he was unopposed for the party selection. Robert Muldoon, a future prime minister who had stood for National in safe Labour seats in the previous two elections, also went for selection despite the request of the National Party president Alex McKenzie to stand aside for Munro. Muldoon won the selection, and won the seat from Labour's Bob Tizard.

Munro returned to New Zealand from Washington and was selected to run in Waipa, where he was elected in 1963 and 1966. After boundary changes, he stood successfully for Hamilton West in 1969. The National Party was in Government for all of those years. However, personal and professional antagonisms with successive prime ministers Keith Holyoake and John Marshall prevented him from attaining high rank in those administrations. Holyoake usually kept him from speaking in caucus until the end of the debate, when the conclusion had been decided.

Private life
Munro was married twice, and had a daughter from each marriage. His first marriage, to Christine Priestley, lasted for two years, as it was cut short by her death in 1929 three days after the birth of their daughter. Munro's second marriage, to Muriel Sturt in 1931, was to last until his death in Hamilton in 1974.

Further reading

Notes and references

External links
 

|-

|-

|-

1901 births
1974 deaths
New Zealand Knights Commander of the Order of St Michael and St George
New Zealand Knights Commander of the Royal Victorian Order
New Zealand anti-communists
20th-century New Zealand lawyers
New Zealand National Party MPs
Presidents of the United Nations General Assembly
University of Auckland alumni
Academic staff of the University of Auckland
Wesleyan University faculty
People educated at Auckland Grammar School
Permanent Representatives of New Zealand to the United Nations
Ambassadors of New Zealand to the United States
Members of the New Zealand House of Representatives
New Zealand MPs for North Island electorates
Articles containing video clips
20th-century New Zealand politicians